Matthew Salacuse is an American photographer from New York City. His portraits of celebrities and musicians have been published by VICE Magazine, New York Mag, Rolling Stone, and The New York Times. Salacuse attended NYU.

Album covers 
Salacuse's photos have been used on the album covers for Life is Good by Nas, and Hot Mess from Cobra Starship.

The Negative Collection 
Salacuse hunts for discarded film negatives at flea markets, collecting the negatives for vintage images to print and sell. Many of these negatives have yielded unseen photographs of celebrities like Leonardo DiCaprio, Frank Sinatra, and Muhammad Ali. Salacuse admits that he does not own the copyright to these lost negatives, but maintains a standing offer to return the negatives (and any money received from sales) should the owner come forward. To date, only the photographer for the Leonardo DiCaprio photos has requested to have their negatives returned.

Commercial photography 
Salacuse also works as a commercial photographer, with his photos appearing in Bloomberg Businessweek, NME, and Entertainment Weekly. He's also taken photos for advertising campaigns for companies like Coach, Nike, Reebok, and Pepsi.

Hip-Hop Evolution 
Salacuse also worked as a cameraman on the HBO Canada documentary Hip-Hop Evolution.

References

External links
Official website

Living people
American photographers
Year of birth missing (living people)